EVA Air is a Taiwanese airline based at Taoyuan International Airport in Tayuan, Taoyuan, near Taipei, operating passenger and dedicated cargo services to over 40 international destinations in Asia, Australia, Europe and North America. EVA Air and their freight division EVA Air Cargo operate flights to the following destinations (excluding code-shares):

Map

List

See also 
 List of China Airlines destinations
 List of Mandarin Airlines destinations
 List of Starlux Airlines destinations

Notes

References

Lists of airline destinations
Destinations
Star Alliance destinations